The mangey, mungey or mangay is a membranophone percussion instrument of Afghanistan and Pakistan. It consists of a large clay pot with a thin skin head stretched over the mouth, and fixed with cords. It is struck directly with fingers and palm, to produce bass and slap sounds. It is usually accompanied by a metal vase, played with the other hand, to produce the treble sounds. The mangey player (mangiwal) carries the rhythmical pattern to accompany the rubab or harmonium players in instrumental music or vocal epic songs.

References
 South Asia : The Indian Subcontinent. (Garland Encyclopedia of World Music, Volume 5). Routledge; Har/Com edition (November 1999).

External links
music video
music video
music video
music video

Membranophones
Afghan musical instruments
Pakistani musical instruments
Indian musical instruments